Union of Russian Citizens is an organisation involved in protecting rights of russophone population in Estonia. The former chairman was Juri Mišin.

References

Ethnic organizations based in Estonia